My Savior is the eighth studio album by American country music singer Carrie Underwood. It was released on March 26, 2021, through Capitol Records Nashville. The gospel album features thirteen tracks, with production from Underwood and David Garcia, who co-produced Underwood's sixth studio album, Cry Pretty (2018). The album debuted at number 4 on the US Billboard 200.

Background and composition
Following the release of her first Christmas album, My Gift, in September 2020, amid the COVID-19 pandemic, Underwood decided to record an album of gospel covers, saying, "This album is one that I have always wanted to make. This is legacy stuff to me." In January 2021, Underwood shared with People, "With everything I do, I just want to be positive. And we had the Christmas album, which was so near and dear to my heart. Last year was a tough year for everybody, and I think just wanting to be positive in this world and sing these songs that bring me so much joy, hopefully, others can be like that as well and these songs can bring others joy. That goes back with everything that I do...I just want to do positive things." Further expanding on her reasoning behind producing a Christian album, Underwood said, "It's been such a blessing to make music like this, inspirational music that is near and dear to my heart. These two albums have been on my musical bucket list since the beginning of my career and were planned long before the events of the past year, but somehow it feels like the perfect time to share these beloved songs with the world."

Bear Rinehart of Needtobreathe provided background vocals for "Nothing but the Blood of Jesus". Underwood described being nervous before asking CeCe Winans to duet with her for the album, saying, "We had talked about asking CeCe to come and sing something with me. We were trying to figure out the game plan, and I always get really nervous about asking people to come sing with me."

Underwood described her original plan for the album, later deciding to incorporate more modern production, saying, "My original thought was, 'We're going to be super traditional about everything.' And then we got into work on it. I'm like, 'Oh, man, a lot of these songs sound the same. Because a lot of them were written a very long time ago, there was only a certain amount of instrumentation available, and they obviously didn't have the technology that we have now.... We kind of wanted to keep the core and the heart true to what these songs are, and didn't want to 'jazz them up' too much. But we definitely wanted to make them really sound like they belonged many years ago and they belong today."

Reflecting on including the song "Just as I Am", Underwood said, "All the times we sang that song, I never thought much of it, because it was always there. And now, as an adult, just as I am - He loves me just as I am. All my flaws, all my insecurities, all my mistakes. He loves me, and that is such a huge, huge realization as an adult."

Promotion
On February 12, the track "Softly and Tenderly" was made available for streaming and purchase. On February 26, "Great Is Thy Faithfulness" was made available to stream. On March 10, "Nothing but the Blood of Jesus" became the third track available prior to the album's release. On March 26, she appeared on the Today show to perform two songs from the album, "Just as I Am" and "Victory in Jesus", and announced a live streaming event on Easter; on April 4, she performed songs from the album at the Ryman Auditorium. Donations of over $100,000 were raised from viewers during the live event for Save the Children. The event also featured special appearances by CeCe Winans and Bear Rinehart. At the 56th ACM awards Underwood performed a medley from the album, including a guest performance with Winans.

Critical reception

My Savior received positive reviews from music critics. Hilary Hughes of Entertainment Weekly graded the album an "A" and praised the production, writing, "With a sparse aesthetic that leans on acoustic arrangements and the strength of Underwood's voice, the listening experience is far closer to what one would find in a church service (that happened to feature a band of Nashville's finest players) than the massive sound of her previous albums."<ref name="entertainmentreview" Riff Magazine gave a positive review of the album, writing, "For those familiar with the themes of the music of Carrie Underwood, it comes as no surprise that she's finally decided to record an album of gospel standards. Her newest album, My Savior, uses tinges of country and pop to fill out the album of traditional hymns, carried mostly by Underwood's ever graceful and soothing voice that propelled her up the charts more than 15 years ago." The website Worship Leader praised the album, writing, "All maintaining the traditional feel that has made these hymns stand the test of time, Underwood manages to put her own modern touch on each of these classic songs without losing one bit of their significant history." Country Universe rated the album 4 out of 5 stars, writing, "Overall, My Savior manages to convey her faith and her musicality in this album, without losing too much sincerity and heart." Saving Country Music rated the album 8 out of 10, writing, "This is not a country record. This is a Christian record. However, along with turning in her first volume of exclusively religious material, Carrie Underwood might have also delivered one of her most country records yet." Spectrum Culture gave a more mixed review and rated the album 68% and stated, "These recordings have a particular audience in mind, and they probably suit that group perfectly. If Underwood plays it too safe on this record, at least she succeeds at producing an acceptable offering. Listeners (with ears to hear) will at least appreciate a remarkable vocalist following her particular calling."

Accolades
The album was nominated for Bluegrass/Country/Roots Album of the Year at the 52nd GMA Dove Awards, while "Great Is Thy Faithfulness" won the award for Inspirational Recorded Song of the Year.
The album won Best Roots Gospel Album at the 64th Annual Grammy Awards.

64th Annual Grammy Awards

|-
| style="text-align:center;"|2022 || style="text-align:center;"| My Savior || style="text-align:center;"| Best Roots Gospel Album || 
|-

Commercial performance
The album debuted at number four on the Billboard 200, moving 73,000 units, of which 68,000 were physical albums, with over 5 million streams, and marked Underwood's ninth consecutive chart-topping album on the Top Country Albums chart. Underwood became the first artist in Billboard history to have nine consecutive albums debut at the top of the Country Albums chart. As of January 2022, the album has sold over 293,000 units in the United States.

Track listing

Personnel
Credits adapted from Tidal.

Musicians

 Buddy Greene – harmonica 
 Carrie Underwood – vocals , background vocals , arrangement 
 David Garcia – arrangement , piano , background vocals , keyboards , percussion 
 Charlie Worsham – acoustic guitar , mandolin  
 Fred Eltringham – drums , percussion 
 Derek Wells – electric guitar 
 Tom Bukovac – electric guitar 
 Charlie Judge – keyboards 
 Jimmie Lee Sloas – acoustic bass guitar , bass 
 Bryan Sutton – acoustic guitar , mandolin 
 Mac McAnally – acoustic guitar , bouzouki 
 Dave Cohen – keyboards , piano 
 Ilya Toshinsky – acoustic guitar 
 Russ Pahl – pedal steel 
 Bear Rinehart – background vocals 
 Sari Reist – cello 
 Gordon Mote – piano 
 Kris Wilkinson – string arrangement, viola 
 Betsy Lamb – viola 
 David Angell – violin 
 Alicia Enstrom – violin 
 Jun Iwasaki – violin 
 David Davidson – violin 
 CeCe Winans – vocals 
 Mateus Asato – electric guitar 
 Brett James – background vocals 
 Ivey Childers – background vocals 

Technical

 Joe LaPorta – mastering
 David Garcia – mixer ; recording engineer, digital editing, vocal engineer 
 F. Reid Shippen – mixer 
 Manny Marroquin – mixer 
 Serban Ghenea – mixer 
 Justin Niebank – mixer 
 Chris Galland – mix engineer  
 John Hanes – mix engineer 
 Drew Bollman – recording engineer , assistant mixer 
 Josh Ditty – recording engineer, string engineer 
 Michael Mechling – assistant mixer 
 Jeremie Inhaber – assistant mixer 
 Robin Florent – assistant mixer 
 Scott Desmarais – assistant mixer 
 Kyle Blunt – assistant recording engineer
 Kam Luchterhand – assistant recording engineer
 Ryan Yount – assistant recording engineer 

Design
 Joseph Llanes – cover photo
 Carole Underwood – back cover photo
 James White – art direction

Charts

Weekly charts

Year-end charts

References

2021 albums
Capitol Records Nashville albums
Carrie Underwood albums
Christian country music albums
Gospel albums by American artists